The Triveneto, or Tre Venezie, is a historical region of Italy. The area included what has become the three Italian regions of Venezia Euganea, Venezia Giulia and Venezia Tridentina. This territory was named after the Roman region of Venetia et Histria.

This area is also often referred to as North-Eastern Italy or simply North-East, in Italian Italia nord-orientale or Nord-Est. 

Nowadays the name Triveneto is more commonly used in the Northern Italian dialects, while its original title is still in use in the Neapolitan Language and Southern Italian dialects, and it includes the three Italian regions of Veneto, Friuli-Venezia Giulia and Trentino-Alto Adige/Südtirol: that is to say, the provinces of Belluno, Bolzano, Gorizia, Padua, Pordenone, Rovigo, Trento, Treviso, Trieste, Udine, Venice, Verona, and Vicenza. This area is also the Catholic Ecclesiastical Region of Triveneto.

History 

The entire area was under Austrian rule in 1863; Italy annexed Venezia Euganea in 1866, following the Third Italian War of Independence and a controversial plebiscite (see Venetian nationalism); Venezia Giulia and Venezia Tridentina passed under the Italian rule in 1919, following the end of World War I.

After World War II, Italy retained the most part of Tre Venezie, but lost Slovenian and Croatian majority areas of the upper Isonzo valley (together with the eastern part of Gorizia, today called Nova Gorica), the city of Fiume, most part of Carso region and most part of Istria to Yugoslavia. The areas of Trieste (Zone A) and north-west Istria (Zone B) were formed in the Free Territory of Trieste: in 1954, Italy reannexed Zone A, while Zone B was ceded to Yugoslavia.

Heritage and culture 

This territory [specifically Trentino-Alto Adige/Südtirol and Fruli-Venezia Giuilia] is known well for its close ties with the German and Slavic worlds. Its cultural history dates back to the people who inhabited the area before and during the Roman Empire (Euganei, ancient Veneti, Raeti, Carni, and Cenomani); to the Medieval duchies of Bavaria and Carinthia, Patriarchate of Aquileia and comuni; to the Republic of Venice and the Austrian Empire.

Currently, Italian is used as the official language in all the regions, but other local languages are spoken by the population: Venetian, Friulian, German, Ladin, and Slovene, in their several dialects.  German is a co-official language in Trentino-Alto Adige/Südtirol; Friulian is co-official language in Friuli-Venezia Giulia; Slovene (Friuli-Venezia Giulia) and Ladin (Veneto, Trentino-Alto Adige/Südtirol) are co-official languages in some municipalities.

See also 
Austrian Empire
Graziadio Isaia Ascoli
Italy
Northeast Italy
Padania
Venetia
Venetian nationalism

Notes

References

Further reading
 

Geographic history of Italy